Swami Ramanand Shastri (1908-1974) was an Indian politician. He was elected from the Bijnor  in Uttar Pradesh to the lower House of the Indian Parliament the Lok Sabha as a member of the Indian National Congress in 1952, 1967 and 1971.

Swami Ramanand Shastri died in 1974. The bye-poll necessitated by his death was won unopposed by Ram Dayal of Congress when his Jana Sangh rival withdrew from the contest.

References

External links
Official biographical sketch in Parliament of India website

Lok Sabha members from Uttar Pradesh
India MPs 1952–1957
India MPs 1957–1962
India MPs 1962–1967
India MPs 1967–1970
India MPs 1971–1977
1908 births
Year of death missing
People from Ahmedabad district
People from Bijnor district
People from Barabanki district